The 1925 Columbus Tigers season was their sixth in the National Football League. The team failed to improve on their previous record against league teams of 4–4, losing nine games. They tied for sixteenth place in the league.

Schedule

Games in italics are against non-NFL teams.

Standings

References

Columbus Tigers seasons
Columbus Tigers
Columbus Tigers
National Football League winless seasons